Simon Bogetoft Pytlick (born 11 December 2000) is a Danish handball player for GOG Håndbold and the Danish national team.

He made his debut on the Danish national team on 4 November 2021, against Norway at the 2021–22 Golden League Tournament in Trondheim.

From summer 2023 he has a contract with SG Flensburg-Handewitt.

Achievements
Danish Handball League: 
Winner: 2022 
Silver: 2019, 2020
Danish Handball Cup:  
Winner: 2019, 2022

Individual awards
 All Star Team as Best Left Back at the 2023 World Championship
 All-Star Team as Best Left back Danish League 2021–22

Personal life
He is the son of former handball coach and Olympic champion Jan Pytlick.

References

External links

2000 births
Living people
Danish male handball players
People from Svendborg Municipality
Sportspeople from the Region of Southern Denmark